Worldwide Favourites is a compilation album by alternative rock band Adam Again. Released on March 9, 1999, it spans all five of their studio albums and features one previously unreleased track: "Sleepwalk."

Track listing
"Worldwide" – 2:07
"It's All Right" – 4:33
"Hide Away" – 2:51
"Bad News on the Radio" – 3:54
"Strobe" – 2:30
"Eyes Wide Open" – 5:53
"Dig" – 3:27
"Stone" – 4:57
"Homeboys" – 3:41
"The 10th Song" – 5:32
"Deep" – 4:18
"You Can Fall in Love" – 5:46
"All You Lucky People" – 4:26
"Sleepwalk" – 3:50
"River on Fire" – 5:46
"Relapse" – 6:48

References

1999 greatest hits albums
Adam Again albums